Khalsa bole (Gurmukhi: ਖ਼ਾਲਸਈ ਬੋਲੇ or ਖ਼ਾਲਸਾ ਬੋਲੀ; Ḵẖālasa'ī bōlē, Ḵẖālasā bōlī; meaning "words of Khalsa"; alternatively transcribed as Khalsa boli) is a bravado-based dialectical nomenclature developed and spoken by members of the Akali-Nihang sect of Sikhism. It has also been described as a coded language. Other common names for the lect are Gar Gaj Bole (ਗੜਗੱਜ ਬੋਲੇ; meaning "words that thunder"), Nihang Singh de Bole ("words of the Nihang Sikhs"), Nihang Bola ("Nihang speak"), and Khalsa de bole ("words of the Khalsa").

Purpose 
The dialect encompasses the Sikh philosophical concept of remaining ever optimistic, known as Chardi kala. The unique dialect serves martial and mental objectives, such as helping the speaker and listeners remain in high-spirits in the face of adversity. It serves as a verbal act of dissent in the face of troubling circumstances.

History

Origin 
Some claim it was invented by Banda Singh Bahadur, the early 18th century Sikh warrior and martyr. Sikh scholar, Piara Singh Padam, claims it originated earlier in the 17th century, during the time of the Sikh Gurus. The lect developed during the period of intense persecution of the Sikhs by the Mughal and Durrani empires in the 18th century. During that period, Sikhs vacated for the mountains, jungles, and deserts to escape the genocidal policies enacted against them.

Present-day 
The dialect is still used by some modern Sikhs, especially the Akali-Nihangs. Many modern Nihangs are ridiculed for using their dialect. They are often the target for jokes by outsiders.

Linguistic sources 
Khalsa bole sources its vocabulary from "a mixture of Punjabi, Hindi, Farsi and other dialects used in various regions of India".

List of vocabulary examples

See also 

 Chardi kala
 Punjabi language
 Punjabi dialects and languages
 Sant Bhasha

Further reading

Notes

References 

Languages of India
Punjabi language
 
Greater Punjabi languages and dialects
History of Sikhism
Fusional languages
Punjab
Punjabi culture
Tonal languages in non-tonal families
 
Sikh groups and sects
Punjabi words and phrases